Weatherman or Weather man may refer to:

Professions or roles
 Weatherman, a member of Weather Underground, an American left-wing organization active 1969–1977
 Weather forecaster, a scientist who forecasts the weather
 Weather presenter, a presenter of weather forecasts on television or radio

People
 Kyle Weatherman (born 1997), American race car driver
 Woody Weatherman (born 1965), American guitarist in Corrosion of Conformity
 David Wills (musician), also known as "The Weatherman", member of the band Negativland

Arts, entertainment, and media

Fictional characters
 Weatherman, the fictional leader of Stormwatch in comics
 J. Walter Weatherman, a character on the American television comedy Arrested Development

Music

Albums
 The Weatherman (album), a 2013 album by American singer-songwriter Gregory Alan Isakov
 The Weatherman LP, a 2007 album by American hip-hop artist Evidence
 Weatherman and Skin Goddess, a 2008 EP by American Robert Pollard

Songs
 "Weatherman", a song by singer-songwriter Delbert McClinton from his eponymous 1993 album that appeared in the movie Groundhog Day
 "Weatherman" (song), a 1998 single by Irish band Juniper
 "Weatherman", a song from the 2010 album Walking with the Night, by American singer Adriana Evans
 "Weatherman", a 2012 song by American band Dead Sara

Other arts, entertainment, and media
 "Weatherman" (short story), a 1990 science-fiction short story by American Lois McMaster Bujold
 The Weather Man, a 2005 American film

See also
 Digital Weatherman, a system for automated audio weather forecasts first marketed in 1986
 Weather Girl (disambiguation)
 Weathermen (disambiguation)